Terry Baker (born May 8, 1962) is a former punter and placekicker from 1987 to 2002 for four teams of the Canadian Football League. In 1998 and 2000 he led the league in scoring.

Baker played high school football for Cobequid Educational Centre in Truro.

External links
Nova Scotia Sport Hall of Fame inductee webpage

1962 births
Living people
Acadia Axemen football players
Canadian football placekickers
Canadian football punters
Canadian people of English descent
Montreal Alouettes players
Mount Allison University alumni
Ottawa Rough Riders players
People from Bridgewater, Nova Scotia
Players of Canadian football from Nova Scotia
Saskatchewan Roughriders players
Toronto Argonauts players